is a Japanese actress and voice actress. She is married to singer Isao Sasaki and is a childhood friend of fellow voice actor Katsuji Mori.

Notable voice work

Anime television series
 8 Man (Sachiko Seki)
City Hunter (Megumi Iwasaki)
Chōdenji Robo Combattler V (Chizuru Nanbara)
Chōdenji Machine Voltes V (Megumi Oka)
Gatchaman II (Professor Pandora)
Lady Georgie (Mother)
Lupin III Part III (Sarah)
Lupin III (2nd Series) (Cornelia, Patra Lawrence (fake))
Miyuki (Miyuki Kashima's mother)
The Rose of Versailles (Marie Antoinette)
Space Battleship Yamato (Starsha)
Space Battleship Yamato: The New Journey (Starsha)
Tekkaman: The Space Knight (Hiromi Tenchi)
Tōshō Daimos (Erika)
Weiß Kreuz (Rex)

OVA
The Galaxy Railways (Louie Fort Drake's mother)

Movies
Farewell Space Battleship Yamato (Teresa)
Be Forever Yamato (Starsha)
Mobile Suit Gundam (Icelina Eschonbach)
The Secret of NIMH (Mrs. Brisby)

Games
Space Battleship Yamato Series (Starsha)
The Distant Star Iscandar
Memories of Iscandar
Super Robot Wars Series (Chizuru Nanbara, Megumi Oka)

TV Drama
Kamen Rider (Fumie Kawamoto, guest actress in episode 29)
Barom One (Shizuka Shiratori)
Ganbare!! Robokon (Yoshiko Ogawa)

Overseas dubbing
Charlie's Angels – Kelly Garrett (Jaclyn Smith)
The Concorde ... Airport '79 (1982 TV Asahi edition) – Isabelle (Sylvia Kristel)
The Eiger Sanction – Jemima Brown (Vonetta McGee)
Mac and Me – Janet Cruise (Christine Ebersole)
Tourist Trap – Becky (Tanya Roberts)

References

External links

Japanese film actresses
Japanese television actresses
Japanese video game actresses
Japanese voice actresses
1944 births
Living people
Actresses from Tokyo
Aoni Production voice actors
20th-century Japanese actresses
21st-century Japanese actresses